Lucky Bastards is the fifth studio album by the Dutch rockband 'Peter Pan Speedrock'.

Track listing
"Surfwrecker"
"Go Satan Go"
"Killerspeed"
"Back In The City"
"Knuckleboys"
"Dead End"
"Twist Of Fate"
"Smokin' Ass"
"Black Beauty '69"
"Always Drunk, Always Loud, Always Right!"
"Lone Star City"
"Lucky Bastards"
"Bitch On Wheels"

External links
official Peter Pan Speedrock website
 website of Peter Pan Speedrock local rockscene

Peter Pan Speedrock albums
2003 albums